Claudio Lafarga (born July 25, 1979, in Mexico City, Distrito Federal, Mexico), is a Mexican actor. He is known for his work on XY. La revista (2009), 2033 (2009) and Alicia en el país de María (2014).

Filmography

Film roles

Television roles

Awards and nominations

References

External links

1979 births
Mexican male telenovela actors
Living people
21st-century Mexican male actors
Mexican male television actors
Mexican male film actors
Male actors from Mexico City